The Men's 200 metres T37 event at the 2012 Summer Paralympics took place at the London Olympic Stadium on 31 August.

Records
Prior to the competition, the existing World and Paralympic records were as follows:

Results

Round 1
Competed 31 August 2012 from 11:33. Qual. rule: first 3 in each heat (Q) plus the 2 fastest other times (q) qualified.

Heat 1

Heat 2

Final
Competed 31 August 2012 at 20:08.

 
Q = qualified by place. q = qualified by time. PR = Paralympic Record. RR = Regional Record. PB = Personal Best.

References

Athletics at the 2012 Summer Paralympics
2012 in men's athletics